Ludwigslust-Parchim is a district in the west of Mecklenburg-Vorpommern, Germany. The district seat is Parchim, a branch office of the administration is located in Ludwigslust.

After Mecklenburgische Seenplatte, it is the second-biggest district in Germany by area. It also has the lowest population density of the districts in Mecklenburg-Vorpommern, and the sixth-lowest in Germany overall.

Geographic features
The district is bordered by (clockwise starting from the west) the state Schleswig-Holstein, the district Nordwestmecklenburg, the district-free city Schwerin, the districts Rostock and Mecklenburgische Seenplatte and the states Brandenburg and Lower Saxony.

There are a number of lakes within the boundaries of Ludwigslust-Parchim district, including:
 Goldberger See
 Damerower See
 Barniner See
 Kleinpritzer See
 Woseriner See

History 
Ludwigslust-Parchim District was established by merging the former districts of Ludwigslust and Parchim as part of the local government reform of September 2011. The name of the district was decided by referendum on September 4, 2011. The project name for the district was Südwestmecklenburg.

Towns and municipalities
The district is made-up of 15 Ämter, as well as five Amt-free towns. In total, it comprises 142 municipalities, of which 16 are towns.

References